Chang Chenchen (born 20 June 1986) is a female Chinese international table tennis player.

She won the bronze medal at the 2009 World Table Tennis Championships – Mixed Doubles with Hao Shuai.

See also
 List of table tennis players

References

Table tennis players from Anshan
Living people
1986 births
Chinese female table tennis players
World Table Tennis Championships medalists
Chinese expatriate sportspeople in Japan
Expatriate table tennis people in Japan